State of Mind, is an album by American contemporary gospel music group Commissioned, released in 1990 on Verity Records. It was the last album with the original line-up of the group. Keith Staten and Michael Brooks left the group.

Domestically, the album peaked at number 4 on the US Billboard Top Gospel albums chart and number 19 on the Billboard Top Contemporary Christian chart.

Track listing
 "He Set Me Free" – 5:00
 "One Step After Another" – 4:46
 "I Am Here" – 5:03
 "At the Point of Your Need" – 4:23
 "I Will Never Leave You" – 4:56
 "Back to My First Love" – 4:41
 "The Way You Love Me" – 5:09
 "If God Is for Us" – 4:55
 "Let Me Tell It" – 4:35
 "Everlasting Love" – 5:01
 "Somebody's Watchin' You" – 4:34

Personnel
Fred Hammond: vocals, bass, synthesizer, drum programming
Keith Staten: vocals
Mitchell Jones: vocals, keyboards, synthesizer
Karl Reid: vocals
Michael Brooks: keyboards
Michael Williams: drums

Additional Musicians
Eric Brice: guitar
Parkes Stewart: background vocals
Randy Jacobs: guitar, sitar
David McMurray: saxophone
Randy Poole: programming

References

Commissioned (gospel group) albums
1991 albums